Quincy D. Watts (born June 19, 1970) is an American former athlete, and two time gold medallist at the 1992 Summer Olympics.

Career
Born in Detroit, Michigan, Quincy Watts attended the University of Southern California (USC) where he excelled as a general athlete and a wide receiver on the college football team. He took up track at Sutter Middle School and later went to Taft High School in Woodland Hills, California, a neighborhood in Los Angeles. In 1987, he ran a 10.36s 100 m, which stands as the Los Angeles city section record, and at the time was the second fastest in CIF history, behind only Henry Thomas' 10.25 in 1985. That same year he repeated as the 200 meters Champion at the CIF California State Championships in Sacramento.

Watts began as a short sprinter, specializing for 100 m and 200 m, but the USC coach Jim Bush, convinced him to run 400 m, where he found his success.

In 1992, by far his most successful year, he won the gold medal in the Olympic 400 m. He twice broke Lee Evans' Olympic record of 43.86, (set at altitude during the 1968 games in Mexico), clocking 43.71 in his semi-final, before going on to record 43.50 in the final. He was a member of the 4 × 400 m relay team, running the second leg in 43.10, which smashed the then-world record in a time of 2:55.74.

At the World Championships in 1991, Watts won a silver medal in 4x400 relay, which he turned to gold in the following championships in 1993 running the second leg on the team that took almost a second and a half off the then-World Record he had been a part of the year before. That race time still stands as the World Record. In the 1993 Individual 400m Final, where Watts was expecting to challenge the time of his relay teammates Michael Johnson and Butch Reynolds, his custom built Nike shoe disintegrated as he was coming off the final turn. Continuing to run, he still managed fourth place. Since this incident, poor Nike shoe quality has been referred to as "doing the Quincy Watts" in track circles. It has also affected Nike's concern for quality control.

In 1994 and 1995, he failed to break 45 seconds and in 1996 finished a disappointing seventh in the US Olympic trials in a time of 45.64. Overshadowed by Michael Johnson, he retired in 1997 and was hired as the head coach to Taft High School. After his tenure at Taft, he worked as an assistant track coach at Harvard-Westlake School. Watts is currently an assistant coach for both Men's and Women's sprints at the University of Southern California and trains a number of professional athletes such as Willie McGinest and Curtis Conway, who was a high school competitor of Watts.

Watts currently holds the position of head coach at USC.

References

External links

1970 births
Living people
American male sprinters
American football wide receivers
USC Trojans football players
Athletes (track and field) at the 1991 Pan American Games
Athletes (track and field) at the 1992 Summer Olympics
Olympic gold medalists for the United States in track and field
University of Southern California alumni
USC Trojans track and field coaches
World Athletics Championships medalists
Track and field athletes from California
Track and field athletes from Detroit
Medalists at the 1992 Summer Olympics
Pan American Games medalists in athletics (track and field)
Pan American Games silver medalists for the United States
World Athletics record holders (relay)
Goodwill Games medalists in athletics
William Howard Taft Charter High School alumni
World Athletics Championships winners
Competitors at the 1994 Goodwill Games
Medalists at the 1991 Pan American Games